This is a list of Jews who served as politicians in the United Kingdom and its predecessor states or who were born in the United Kingdom and had notable political careers abroad.

Jewish Leaders
Pre–1900

Benjamin Disraeli (1868-1881) Leader of the Conservative Party and Prime Minister of the United Kingdom

1900-1974

Herbert Samuel, 1st Viscount Samuel (1931-1935) Leader of the Liberal Party (UK)

1974-2000

Michael Howard (2003-2005) Leader of the Conservative Party (UK)

2000-2020

Ed Miliband (2010-2015) Leader of the Labour Party (UK)

2020–Present

Zack Polanski (2022-) Deputy Leader of the Green Party of England and Wales

British MPs
A law in place until the 1850s stated that no member of the Jewish religion could be elected to Parliament. Some Christian denominations were similarly prohibited. If elected, a member would be excluded if he refused to swear an oath of abjuration with a strong Christian wording.

British Members of Parliament listed chronologically by first election date (in brackets)

Pre–1900

Lord George Gordon (1774–1780) Converted to Judaism 
Sampson Eardley (1770–1802) Father was Jewish. Eardley was baptised. Tory MP
Manasseh Masseh Lopes (1802–1806, 1807–1808, 1812–1819 & 1820–1829) Lopes converted to Christianity in 1802, and later the same year he entered Parliament as a Tory MP
Ralph Lopes (1814–1819, 1831–1837, 1841–1847 & 1849–1854) Conservative MP. 
Ralph Bernal (1818–1841 & 1842–1852) His father was Jewish, but Bernal was baptised. Whig MP
David Ricardo (1819–1823) Ricardo converted to Christianity in 1793. Whig MP
David Ricardo (the younger) (1832–1833) His father had been Jewish, but Ricardo was baptised. Liberal MP
Benjamin Disraeli (1837–1876)  , Conservative MP and Prime Minister of the United Kingdom. Born Jewish but baptised at an early age.
John Lewis Ricardo (1841–1862) Liberal MP
Ralph Bernal Osborne (1841–1874) His grandfather was Jewish, but Bernal Osborne was baptised. Liberal MP
Lionel de Rothschild (1847–1868 & 1869–1874) , Liberal MP. 
David Salomons (1851–1852 & 1859–1873) Liberal MP. 
Massey Lopes (1857–1885) Conservative MP
Mayer Amschel de Rothschild (1859–1874) Liberal MP
Francis Henry Goldsmid (1860–1878) Liberal MP
Frederick Goldsmid (1865–1866) Liberal MP
Nathan Rothschild (1865–1885) Liberal MP
Joseph d'Aguilar Samuda (1865–1880) Liberal MP
Julian Goldsmid (1866–1896) Liberal and later Liberal Unionist MP
George Jessel (1868–1873)  Liberal MP
Henry Lopes (1868–1876) Conservative MP
John Simon(1868–1888) Liberal MP
Farrer Herschell (1874–1885) Liberal MP
Saul Isaac (1874–1880) Conservative MP
Henry Drummond Wolff (1874–1885) Conservative MP
Arthur Cohen (1880–1888) Liberal MP
Henry de Worms (1880–1895) Conservative MP
Harry Levy-Lawson (1885–1892, 1893–1895, 1905–1906 & 1910–1916) Liberal and later Liberal Unionist MP
Lionel Louis Cohen (1885–1887) Conservative MP
Lewis Henry Isaacs (1885–1892) Conservative MP
Samuel Montagu (1885–1900) Liberal MP
Ferdinand de Rothschild (1885–1898) Liberal and later Liberal Unionist Party MP
Herbert Jessel (1896–1906 & 1910–1918) Liberal Unionist and later Conservative MP
Sydney Stern (1891–1895) Liberal MP
Herbert Leon (1891–1895) Liberal MP
Benjamin Cohen (1892–1906) Conservative MP
Coningsby Disraeli (1892–1906) Conservative MP
Henry Lopes (1892–1900) Conservative MP
Gustav Wilhelm Wolff (1892–1910) Conservative MP
Harry Samuel (1895–1906 & 1910–1922) Conservative MP
Arthur Strauss (1895–1900 & 1910–1918) Liberal Unionist Party and later Conservative MP
Walter Rothschild (1899–1910) Liberal Unionist and later Conservative MP
Edward Sassoon (1899–1912) Liberal Unionist MP

1900–1939

Stuart Samuel (1900–1916) Liberal MP
Herbert Samuel (1902–1918 & 1929–1935) Liberal MP and Leader of the Liberal Party
Rufus Isaacs (1904–1913) Liberal MP
Charles Henry (1906–1919) Liberal MP
Arthur Lever (1906–1910 & 1922–1923) Liberal MP
Maurice Levy (1906–1918) Liberal MP
Philip Magnus (1906–1922) Conservative MP
Alfred Mond (1906–1928) Liberal and then Conservative MP
Edwin Samuel Montagu (1906–1922) Liberal MP. Montagu was the third practising British Jew to enter the Cabinet and was strongly opposed to Zionism, which he called "a mischievous political creed", and opposed the Balfour Declaration of 1917, which he considered anti-Semitic.
Horatio Myer (1906–1910) Liberal MP
Harry Primrose (1906–1910) Liberal MP
Herbert Raphael (1906–1918) Liberal MP
Bertram Straus (1906–1910) Liberal MP
Edward Strauss (1906–1910, 1910–1923, 1927–1929 & 1931–1939) Liberal and then Liberal National MP
Felix Cassel (1910–1916) Conservative MP
Sydney Goldman (1910–1918) Conservative MP
Frank Goldsmith (1910–1918) Conservative MP
Trebitsch Lincoln (1910) Liberal MP
Neil Primrose (1910–1917) Liberal MP
Lionel Nathan de Rothschild (1910–1923) Conservative MP
Maurice de Forest (1911–1918) – Liberal MP
Leo Amery (1911–1945) Conservative MP
Samuel Samuel (1913–1934) Conservative MP
Percy Alfred Harris (1916–1918 & 1922–1945) Liberal MP
Gerald Hurst (1918–1923 & 1924–1935) Conservative MP
Arthur Samuel (1918–1937) Conservative MP
Maurice Alexander (1922–1923) Liberal MP
Manny Shinwell (1922–1924, 1928–1931 & 1935–1970) Labour MP
Leonard Benjamin Franklin (1923–1924) Liberal MP
Ernest Spero (1923–1924 & 1929–1930) Liberal and then Labour MP
Leslie Haden-Guest (1923–1927 & 1937–1950) Labour MP
Leslie Hore-Belisha (1923–1945), Liberal and then Liberal National MP
Henry Mond (1923–1924 & 1929–1931) Liberal and then Conservative MP
Frank Meyer (1924–1929) Conservative MP
Isidore Salmon (1924–1941) Conservative MP
Henry Slesser (1924–1929) Labour MP
Harry Louis Nathan (1929–1935 & 1937–1940), Liberal and then Labour MP
Marion Phillips (1929–1931) Labour MP
James de Rothschild (1929–1945) Liberal MP
George Strauss (1929–1931 & 1934–1979) Labour MP
Alfred Beit (1931–1945) Conservative MP
Alfred Chotzner (1931–1934) Conservative MP
Louis Gluckstein (1931–1945) Conservative MP
Barnett Janner (1931–1935 & 1945–1970) Liberal and then Labour MP
Dudley Joel (1931–1941) Conservative MP
Thomas Levy (1931–1945) Conservative MP
Abraham Lyons (1931–1945) Conservative MP
Marcus Samuel (1934–1942) Conservative MP
Henry Strauss (1935–1945 & 1946–1955) Conservative MP
Sydney Silverman (1935–1968) Labour MP 1935
Daniel Frankel (1935–1945) Labour MP
Lewis Silkin (1936–1950) Labour MP
Daniel Lipson (1937–1950) Independent Conservative MP

1940–1973

John Mack (1942–1951) Labour MP
Herschel Lewis Austin (1945–1950) Labour MP
Louis Comyns (1945–1950) Labour MP
John Diamond (1945–1951 & 1957–1970) Labour MP
Maurice Edelman (1945–1976) Labour MP
Mont Follick, (1945–1955) Labour MP
Harold Lever (1945–1979) Labour MP
George Jeger (1945–1971) Labour MP
Santo Jeger (1945–1953) Labour MP
Benn Levy (1945–1950) Labour MP
Marcus Lipton (1945–1978) Labour MP 
Ian Mikardo (1945–1959 & 1964–1987) Labour MP
Maurice Orbach (1945–1959 & 1964–1979) Labour MP
Phil Piratin (1945–1950) Communist Party of Great Britain MP
Samuel Segal (1945–1950) Labour MP
Julius Silverman (1945–1983) Labour MP
Barnett Stross (1945–1966) Labour MP
David Weitzman (1945–1979) Labour MP
Austen Albu, (1948–1974) Labour MP
Julian Amery (1950–1992) Conservative MP
Leslie Lever (1950–1970) Labour MP
Gerald Nabarro (1950–1973) Conservative MP
Frank Allaun (1955–1983) Labour MP
Henry d'Avigdor-Goldsmid (1955–1974) Conservative MP
Keith Joseph (1956–1987) Conservative MP
Philip Goodhart (1957–1992) Conservative MP
Leo Abse (1958–1987) Labour MP
Michael Cliffe (1958–1964) Labour MP
Myer Galpern (1959–1979) Labour MP
David Ginsburg (1959–1983) Labour and later Social Democratic Party MP
John Mendelson (1959–1978) Labour MP
John Silkin (1963–1987) Labour MP
Joel Barnett (1964–1983), Labour MP
Edmund Dell (1964–1979) Labour MP
Reginald Freeson (1964–1987), Labour MP
David Kerr (1964–1970) Labour MP
Robert Maxwell (1964–1970), Labour MP
Maurice Miller (1964–1987) Labour MP
Paul Rose (1964–79) Labour MP
Samuel Silkin (1964–1983) Labour MP
Robert Sheldon (1964–2001), Labour MP
Renée Short (1964–1987) Labour MP
Edward Lyons (1966–1983) Labour and later Social Democratic Party MP
Eric Moonman (1966–1970 & 1974–1979) Labour MP
Robert Adley (1970–1993) Conservative MP
Jack d'Avigdor-Goldsmid (1970–1974) Conservative MP
Sally Oppenheim-Barnes (1970–1987) Conservative MP
Stanley Clinton-Davis (1970–1983) Labour MP
Michael Fidler (1970–1974) Conservative MP
Geoffrey Finsberg (1970–1992) Conservative MP
Greville Janner (1970–1997) Labour MP
Toby Jessel (1970–1997) Conservative MP
Gerald Kaufman (1970–2017), Labour MP
Anthony Meyer (1970–1997), Conservative MP
Harold Soref (1970–1974) Conservative MP
Neville Sandelson (1971–1983) Labour and later Social Democratic Party MP
Clement Freud (1973–1987) Liberal MP
Tim Sainsbury (1973–1997) Conservative MP

1974–2000

Leon Brittan (1974–1988), Conservative MP
Ivan Lawrence (1974–1997), Conservative MP
Nigel Lawson (1974–1992), Conservative MP
Millie Miller (1974–1977), Labour MP
Malcolm Rifkind (1974–1997 & 2005–2015), Conservative MP
Anthony Steen (1974–2010), Conservative MP
Alf Dubs (1979–1987), Labour MP
Sheila Faith (1979–1983), Conservative MP
David Winnick (1979–2017), Labour MP
Mark Wolfson (1979–1997), Conservative MP
Alex Carlile (1983–1997), Liberal and later Liberal Democrat MP
Harry Cohen (1983–2010), Labour MP
Edwina Currie (1983–1997), Conservative MP
Michael Howard (1983–2010), Conservative MP and Leader of the Conservative Party
Phillip Oppenheim (1983–1997), Conservative MP
David Sumberg (1983–1997), Conservative MP
Irvine Patnick (1987–1997), Conservative MP
Gerry Steinberg (1987–2005), Labour MP
Michael Fabricant (1992–present), Conservative MP
Peter Mandelson (1992–2004), Labour MP
Barbara Roche (1992–2005), Labour MP
Margaret Hodge (1994–present), Labour MP
John Bercow (1997–2019), Conservative MP and Speaker of the House of Commons
Peter Bradley (1997–2005), Labour MP
Ivor Caplin (1997–2005), Labour MP
Louise Ellman (1997–2019), Labour and later Independent MP
Fabian Hamilton (1997–present), Labour MP
Evan Harris (1997–2010), Liberal Democrat MP
Oona King (1997–2005), Labour MP
Oliver Letwin (1997–2019), Conservative MP
Julian Lewis (1997–present), Conservative MP
Ivan Lewis (1997–2019), Labour MP and later independent MP
Gillian Merron (1997–2010), Labour MP

2000–present

Jonathan Djanogly (2001–present), Conservative MP; Djanogly was born in London to a British Jewish family, the son of multimillionaire textile manufacturer Sir Harry Djanogly and Lady Djanogly.
Paul Goodman (2001–2010) Conservative MP
George Osborne (2001–2017), Conservative MP
Ed Miliband (2005–present), Labour MP and former Leader of the Labour Party; son of Ralph Miliband, a leading  Marxist intellectual.
David Miliband (2001–2013), Labour MP; son of Ralph Miliband, a leading  Marxist intellectual.
Susan Kramer (2005–2010), Liberal Democrat MP
Lynne Featherstone (2005–2015), Liberal Democrat MP
Brooks Newmark (2005–2015), Conservative MP
Grant Shapps (2005–present), Conservative MP
Lee Scott (2005–2015), Conservative MP; from 1988 to 1998, he was Campaign Director for the United Jewish Israel Appeal.
Luciana Berger (2010–2019), Labour Co-operative MP and later Liberal Democrat MP; served as director of Labour Friends of Israel.Berger became a vice president of the Jewish Leadership Council in June 2019.
Michael Ellis (2010–present), Conservative MP
Zac Goldsmith (2010–2016 & 2017–2019), Conservative MP
Robert Halfon (2010–present), Conservative MP; Chief of Staff to Shadow Chancellor of the Exchequer Oliver Letwin. He was also the political director of Conservative Friends of Israel.
Richard Harrington (2010–2019), Conservative MP; Harrington was appointed Minister of State for Refugees, also in charge of co-ordinating UK’s response to humanitarian crisis caused by Russia’s invasion of Ukraine; also elevated to the House of Lords after being given a Life Peerage.
Julian Huppert (2010–2015), Liberal Democrat MP
John Mann, Baron Mann (born 10 January 1960) is a British independent politician who serves as an advisor to the Government on Antisemitism, sitting as a Member of the House of Lords. Prior to being granted a peerage, he was the Labour Party Member of Parliament (MP) for Bassetlaw from the 2001 general election until 28 October 2019.
Andrew Percy (2010–present), Conservative MP; has been part of a number of delegations of the Conservative Friends of Israel group,
Lucy Frazer (2015–present), Conservative MP
Dominic Raab (born 25 February 1974) is a British politician who served as Deputy Prime Minister of the United Kingdom, Secretary of State for Justice and Lord Chancellor from 2021 to 2022.
James Schneider (born 17 June 1987) is an English political organiser, journalist and writer; co-founded the left-wing grassroots movement Momentum; was PR advisor to Jeremy Corbyn as Director of Strategic Communications.
Ruth Smeeth (2015–2019), Labour MP; from 2010 to 2015, she was a deputy director of anti-racist organisation, Hope not Hate. She has also been employed by the Community Security Trust and has worked for the Board of Deputies of British Jews. In June 2020, she became chief executive of Index on Censorship. Smeeth was appointed an Honorary Captain in the Royal Naval Reserve in July 2021.
Alex Sobel (2017–present), Labour MP; born in Leeds to parents who migrated from Israel in 1971.
Jack Straw (born 3 August 1946) is a British politician who served in the Cabinet from 1997 to 2010 under the Labour governments of Tony Blair and Gordon Brown.
Ian Levy (2019–present), Conservative MP
Charlotte Nichols (2019–present), Labour MP
Christopher Tugendhat, Baron Tugendhat  (born 23 February 1937) is a British Conservative Party politician, businessman, company director, journalist and author. He was a Member of Parliament from 1970 to 1977, then a member of the European Commission, and in 1993 was appointed as a life peer, with a seat in the House of Lords, in which he remains active.
Tom Tugendhat,  (born 27 June 1973) is a British politician. A member of the Conservative Party, he has served as Minister of State for Security since September 2022. He previously served as Chairman of the Foreign Affairs Committee from 2017 to 2022. Tugendhat has been the Member of Parliament (MP) for Tonbridge and Malling since 2015.

Peers

Alma Birk, Baroness Birk, Labour
 Lord Baron Daniel Finkelstein,(born 30 August 1962); journalist and politician; writes for Jewish Chronicle; former executive editor of The Times.; former chairman of Policy Exchange; chair of the think tank Onward; made a member of the House of Lords in August 2013, sitting as a Conservative.
Dora Gaitskell, Baroness Gaitskell, Labour
Maurice Glasman, Baron Glasman (born 8 March 1961); prolific author, political theorist, academic, social commentator, and Labour life peer in the House of Lords
Dean Godson, Baron Godson  (born 26 August 1962)
Peter Goldsmith, Baron Goldsmith, Labour
Arnold Goodman, Baron Goodman, Labour
Richard Harrington, Baron Harrington of Watford, Lord, (born 4 November 1957); in 2022, appointed Minister of State for Refugees, in charge of co-ordinating the UK’s response to humanitarian crisis caused by Russia’s invasion of Ukraine; elevated to House of Lords after being given Life Peerage.
Sydney Jacobson, Baron Jacobson, Crossbench
Michael Levy, Baron Levy, (born 11 July 1944) is a Labour Party peer; was chief fundraiser for the Labour Party and Tony Blair's special envoy to the Middle East; founded Magnet Records , one of the most successful independent labels of its day; involved in fundraising for Jewish and Israeli causes and ran the Labour Leader's Office Fund to finance Blair's campaign before the 1997 general election; created a life peer on 23 September 1997 as Baron Levy, of Mill Hill in the London Borough of Barnet; described by The Jerusalem Post as "undoubtedly the notional leader of British Jewry". He was a founding member of the Jewish Leadership Council, the leadership of UK Jewish community and has close ties with Israeli political leaders.  His son, Daniel Levy was assistant to former Israeli Prime Minister Ehud Barak and to  former Knesset member Yossi Beilin and is now President of the US Middle East Project; before that was Head of the Middle East Department of the European Council of Foreign Relations and Levy was associated with the Labour Friends of Israel From 1998 until 2007, he acted as Prime Minister Blair's personal envoy to the Middle East.
Peter Mandelson, Baron Mandelson, The Right Honourable The Lord Mandelson  (born 21 October 1953) is a British Labour Party politician who served as First Secretary of State from 2009 to 2010. 
John Mann, Baron Mann (born 10 January 1960) is a British independent politician who serves as an advisor to the Government on Antisemitism, sitting as a Member of the House of Lords. Prior to being granted a peerage, he was the Labour Party Member of Parliament (MP) for Bassetlaw from the 2001 general election until 28 October 2019. He was created Baron Mann, of Holbeck Moor in the City of Leeds, on 28 October 2019, and was introduced to the House of Lords the next day.
Maurice Peston, Baron Peston of Mile End, Labour; father of Robert Peston.
Beatrice Plummer, Baroness Plummer, Labour
Beatrice Serota, Baroness Serota, Labour; mother of Sir Nicholas Serota
Christopher Tugendhat, Baron Tugendhat  (born 23 February 1937) is a British Conservative Party politician, businessman, company director, journalist and author. He was a Member of Parliament from 1970 to 1977, then a member of the European Commission, and in 1993 was appointed as a life peer, with a seat in the House of Lords, in which he remains active.
Robert Winston, Baron Winston,  (born 15 July 1940) is a British professor, author, journalist, medical doctor, scientist, television presenter and Labour Party politician.He is a member of Labour Friends of Israel; father of Ben Winston
Leonard Wolfson, Baron Wolfson, Conservative
Harry Woolf, Baron Woolf, Crossbench

People with careers abroad
Julius Vogel, eighth Premier and first Jewish prime minister of New Zealand.

See also

History of the Jews in England
History of the Jews in Ireland
History of the Jews in Scotland
History of the Jews in Wales
List of British Jews
List of Britons
List of Jewish Fellows of the Royal Society
List of Scottish Jews – political figures
Lists of Jews

Bibliography
JYB = Jewish Year Book (annual)

References

Politicians
British people of Jewish descent